Give Us the Moon is a 1944 British comedy film directed and written by Val Guest and starring Vic Oliver, Margaret Lockwood and Peter Graves.

Plot
Made in 1943-44, the film is set in a future peacetime Britain, after the end of World War II. Peter Pyke, the son of a millionaire hotel owner, had been a RAF pilot during the war but, much to the frustration of his hard-working father, he does not want to work for a living, and idles his time away while living in his father's hotel (named "Eisenhower Hotel"). So when Peter stumbles across a group of people, mainly White Russian émigrés who call themselves “White Elephants” and refuse to work or be of any use to society, he eagerly accepts their invitation to join them.

Cast
Margaret Lockwood as Nina
Vic Oliver as Sascha
Peter Graves as Peter
Roland Culver as Ferdinand
Frank Cellier as Pyke
Eliot Makeham as Lunka
George Relph as Otto
Max Bacon as Jacobus
Alan Keith as Raphael
Jean Simmons as Heidi
John Salew as Landlord
Iris Lang as Tania
Gibb McLaughlin as Marcel
Irene Handl as Miss Haddock

Production and release
The film is based on the 1939 novel The Elephant is White, written by Caryl Brahms and her Russian émigré writing partner S. J. Simon, but the story was moved from Paris in the 1930s to London in the late 1940s. Brahms and Simon provided additional dialogue to director Val Guest's screenplay.

The film opened at the New Gallery cinema in London on 31 July 1944, less than two months after D-Day and almost a year before the war would end in Europe. Film reviewers at the time were not very impressed - The Times reviewer found it to be "a film which opens well [but] ends not with the bang of vigorous cinematic invention but the whimper of overworked dialogue." - but more recently the film has been described by one reviewer as "one of the most delightful comedies ever made".  Phil Hardy's The Aurum Film Encyclopedia classed the film as a utopian science fiction film but also claimed that "Vic Olivier" was the hotelier.

Lockwood had just become a star with The Man in Grey but did not want to be typecast as a villainess.

References

External links

Give Us the Moon at TCMDB

1944 films
1940s English-language films
Films directed by Val Guest
Gainsborough Pictures films
British black-and-white films
British comedy films
1944 comedy films
Films set in London
1940s British films